Somatidia helmsi is a species of beetle in the family Cerambycidae. It was described by David Sharp in 1882.

References

helmsi
Beetles described in 1882